Bakst is a surname. Notable people with the surname include:

 Isaac Moses Bakst (d. 1882), Imperial Russian educator
 Léon Bakst (1866–1924), Russian painter and scene and costume designer
 Ryszard Bakst (1926–1999), British pianist and piano music teacher of Jewish/Polish/Russian origin

Jewish surnames